Rohan Sarjoo (born 13 November 1974) is a Guyanese cricketer. He played in one first-class and one List A match for Guyana in 1996/97.

See also
 List of Guyanese representative cricketers

References

External links
 

1978 births
Living people
Guyanese cricketers
Guyana cricketers
Sportspeople from Georgetown, Guyana